Tungsten hexacarbonyl (also called tungsten carbonyl) is the chemical compound with the formula W(CO)6. This complex gave rise to the first example of a dihydrogen complex.

This colorless compound, like its chromium and molybdenum analogs, is noteworthy as a volatile, air-stable derivative of tungsten in its zero oxidation state.

Preparation, properties, and structure
W(CO)6 is prepared by the reduction of tungsten hexachloride under a pressure of carbon monoxide. The compound is relatively air-stable. It is sparingly soluble in nonpolar organic solvents. Tungsten carbonyl is widely used in electron beam-induced deposition technique - it is easily vaporized and decomposed by the electron beam providing a convenient source of tungsten atoms.

W(CO)6 adopts an octahedral geometry consisting of six rod-like CO ligands radiating from the central W atom with dipole moment 0 D.

Reactivity
All reactions of W(CO)6 commence with displacement of some CO ligands in W(CO)6. W(CO)6 behaves similarly to the Mo(CO)6 but tends to form compounds that are kinetically more robust.  

Treatment of tungsten hexacarbonyl with sodium cyclopentadienide followed by oxidation of the resulting NaW(CO)3(C5H5) gives cyclopentadienyltungsten tricarbonyl dimer.

One derivative is the dihydrogen complex W(CO)3[P(C6H11)3]2(H2).

Three of these CO ligands can be displaced by acetonitrile.
W(CO)6 has been used to desulfurize organosulfur compounds and as a precursor to catalysts for alkene metathesis.

Safety and handling
Like all metal carbonyls, W(CO)6 is a dangerous source of volatile metal as well as CO.

References

Organotungsten compounds
Carbonyl complexes
Octahedral compounds